The Bangladesh national cricket team toured Pakistan in 2003 to play three Test and five One Day International (ODI) matches. This was Bangladesh's second tour to Pakistan, with the first occurring in 2001–02, when the teams played one Test match. This series was the first international Test cricket series to be held in Pakistan after a 15-month absence due to security concerns. Pakistan announced their squad and included 7 new players without any previous Test cricket experience, after many senior players, such as Wasim Akram, Waqar Younis and Saeed Anwar) retired after 2003 ICC Cricket World Cup.

Both series ended in whitewash, with Pakistan winning the test series 3 – 0 and the ODI series 5 – 0. During the Second Test, Bangladesh's Alok Kapali became the first Bangladeshi and the 32nd cricketer overall to take a Test hat-trick. Pakistan captain, Rashid Latif, was banned for 5 One Day Internationals after the test series for falsely claiming a dropped catch. Therefore, Inzamam-ul-Haq captained the team in the ODI series.

Squads

Test series

1st Test

2nd Test

3rd Test

ODI series

1st ODI

2nd ODI

3rd ODI

4th ODI

5th ODI

Notes

References

External links
 CricketArchive
 Series home at ESPN Cricinfo

2003 in Pakistani cricket
2003
Pakistani cricket seasons from 2000–01
International cricket competitions in 2003
2003 in Bangladeshi cricket